Supported leading edge kite (SLE) is a type of power kite used mainly for kitesurfing.

It refers to a C shaped kite leading edge inflated (LEI) kite where the lines which control the angle of attack (or sheeting) of the kite attach to a bridle via a pulley in a similar way to that of a bow kite. Due to the wider range of angle of attack possible, relative to the wind, this system has vastly improved C kites' ability to depower and has increased the possible wind range.

See also
 Kitesurfing
 Snowkiting
 Power kite
 Bow kite
 Foil kite
 Kite types
 Kite applications
 Kite line
 Kite mooring
 Kite control systems

References

 "Kitesurf - Kites, Kiteboards, Harnesses BLOG _ kite Tech| Unity Watersports".

Kites